Janet Mary McVeagh (née Roborgh 27 December 1941 – January 2005) was a New Zealand disability worker, environmentalist and politician who was a co-leader of the Values Party in the 1980s.

Biography
McVeagh worked for the Crippled Children Society (CCS) as a recreation officer in New Plymouth and later Auckland. She had four children, three sons and one daughter.

She was a long-time advocate for the environment and social justice, leading her to join the Values Party upon its foundation in 1972. McVeagh was the organiser for several local environmental campaigns including protests against the government Think Big policies, to oppose the building of a synthetic petrol plant at Motunui and a clean sea action group which lobbied to get a clean sewage treatment plant in New Plymouth. In 1982 she founded, Residents Against Dioxin, a New Plymouth-based group to cease the production of 2,4,5-Trichlorophenoxyacetic acid (a toxic pesticide used in agriculture) in New Zealand.

She contested the electorate of New Plymouth as the Values candidate at the 1978, 1981 and 1984 elections. From 1982 to 1990 she was a co-leader of the Values Party. The Values Party was wound down starting in 1989 and in 1990 the remnants became part of the new Green Party. McVeagh became the Green Party's disabilities spokesperson.

In 1993 McVeagh moved to Auckland and at the 1999 election was the Green Party candidate for Epsom. She was also allotted the relatively high list placing of 13. She finished fourth out of eleven candidates and was not high enough on the Green Party list to be elected. In Auckland McVeagh started her own business, Janet McVeagh Recreation Ltd, which provided recreation services for disabled adults and children. 

She died in Auckland in January 2005. Her children continued to run her company after her death.

Notes

References

1941 births
2005 deaths
New Zealand women activists
20th-century New Zealand politicians
Values Party politicians
Leaders of political parties in New Zealand
Green Party of Aotearoa New Zealand politicians
Unsuccessful candidates in the 1978 New Zealand general election
Unsuccessful candidates in the 1981 New Zealand general election
Unsuccessful candidates in the 1984 New Zealand general election
Unsuccessful candidates in the 1999 New Zealand general election